Allan Graves is a Canadian and USA  bridge player.

Bridge accomplishments
 Canadian Bridge Hall of Fame
 7 Canadian national Championships

Wins
 World Bridge Championships  (1)
 World Senior Teams 2017 (USA) gold medal
 North American Bridge Championships (5)
 Jacoby Open Swiss Teams (1) 2013 
 Keohane North American Swiss Teams (1) 1986 
 Truscott Senior Swiss Teams (1) 2008 
 Mitchell Board a Match (1) 2015
 Jacoby Open Swiss Teams (1) 2016

Runners-up
 World Bridge Federation 
 World Mixed Teams ( 2019 ) USA Silver medal
 World Bridge Olympiad (1982) Canada Bronze medal.
 North American Bridge Championships (3)
 Senior Knockout Teams (1) 2009 
 Reisinger (1) 1978 
 Spingold (1) 2002

References

External links
 

Canadian contract bridge players
Living people
Year of birth missing (living people)